Collina, an Italian word for "hill", may refer to:

Biology
Collina (ammonite), a genus of Early Jurassic ammonite
Collina (spider), a genus of spider

Places
Collina, New South Wales, a locality in New South Wales, Australia
Collina d'Oro, a municipality in Ticino, Switzerland
Collina (Port Gibson, Mississippi), listed on the National Register of Historic Places listings in Claiborne County, Mississippi, USA

Other uses
Pierluigi Collina (born 1960), Italian football referee
Porta Collina, a Roman landmark

See also
 
 Collinas, Sardinia
 Colina (disambiguation)